Roger Sandberg (born 12 June 1972) is a Swedish football manager and former player. He was most recently the manager for Gefle IF.

On 2 June 2016 it was announced that Gefle IF had sacked Sandberg, after Gefle had just 5 points after 12 games.

Honours

Player
Hammarby
Allsvenskan: 2001

References

External links 
 

Living people
Swedish footballers
Hammarby Fotboll players
Hammarby Fotboll managers
Gefle IF managers
1972 births
IF Brommapojkarna non-playing staff
IFK Luleå players
Umeå FC players
Piteå IF (men) players
Hammarby Fotboll non-playing staff
Gröndals IK players
Allsvenskan players
Association football defenders
People from Luleå
Swedish football managers
Sportspeople from Norrbotten County